Saint Luke's Northland Hospital can refer to several hospitals including:

Saint Luke's North Hospital–Barry Road
Saint Luke's North Hospital–Smithville